Hypolepis sparsisora is an Afrotropical fern species with an extensive range in Africa and Madagascar, where it occurs at diverse altitudes. In South Africa it is present in the Eastern Cape, KwaZulu-Natal, Limpopo, Mpumalanga and the Western Cape.

It has a subterranean, creeping rhizome of up to 9 mm in diameter. The erect fronds are widely spaced and finely divided. The ovate lamina is 1 × 0.8 m in size and 4- to 5-pinnatifid. The small (0.5–1 mm wide), oval sori are borne singly in the sinuses between the lobes.

References

Dennstaedtiaceae
Ferns of Africa
Afrotropical realm flora
Flora of Madagascar
Flora of South Africa
Plants described in 1818